"Together" is a song performed by an Australian Christian pop duo For King & Country with American singer Tori Kelly and American gospel musician Kirk Franklin. It was released as a standalone single on 1 May 2020. It was later included on the deluxe edition of the duo's third studio album Burn the Ships (2018), as well as their fifth studio album, What Are We Waiting For? (2022). The song was written by Joel Smallbone, Luke Smallbone, Ran Jackson, Ricky Jackson and Kirk Franklin.

"Together" peaked at No. 2 on the US Hot Christian Songs chart. The song also went on to peak at No. 23 on the Bubbling Under Hot 100 chart. "Together" received nominations for the GMA Dove Award Song of the Year and Pop/Contemporary Recorded Song of the Year at the 2021 GMA Dove Awards.

Background
On 26 March 2020, For King & Country announced that they will hold a livestream event dubbed Together: A Night of Hope, slated for 27 March, where the duo would be performing with their band members as well as share stories, The duo also announced that Kirk Franklin and Kathie Lee Gifford would be special guests, and there would be an exclusive premiere of a new song during the livestream. The duo debuted the song "Together" during the event, which drew ninety thousand live impressions across various platforms. On 28 April 2020, For King & Country announced that they will be appearing on Good Morning America and performing the new song "Together" on 1 May.

The duo performed the song on Good Morning America with Tori Kelly and Kirk Franklin, joining them for a multi-screen performance. "Together" was released in digital format on 1 May 2020. The song is scheduled to impact Christian radio stations on 22 May 2020.

Writing and development
Following the duo's running into Kirk Franklin at the 2020 Grammys, they sent the song to him and Franklin wrote the bridge, bringing in his choir and band. The duo wanted a female vocal for the song, so they later reached out Tori Kelly, who then sent back her vocals.

Composition
"Together" composed in the key of C minor with a tempo of 89 beats per minute.

Accolades

Music video
The music video of "Together" was published on For King & Country's YouTube channel on 5 May 2020. The music video was filmed in quarantine from the homes of the singers during the COVID-19 pandemic, with each artist performing in front of a black backdrop. Messages of struggle, perseverance and optimism in the form of fan-submitted posters were featured in the music video.

Live performances
On 1 May 2020, For King & Country performed the song live on the television program Good Morning America.

Track listing

Charts

Weekly charts

Year-end charts

Release history

References

2020 singles
2020 songs
For King & Country (band) songs
Tori Kelly songs
Kirk Franklin songs
Songs written by Kirk Franklin
Contemporary Christian songs
Songs written by Joel Smallbone